"Let It Go" is a song performed by Swiss singer Anna Rossinelli from her second studio album Marylou. The single was released on March 6, 2013, as a digital download in Switzerland. The song was written by Georg Schlunegger, Anna Rossinelli, Georg Dillier and Manuel Meisel.

Track listing

Credits and personnel
 Lead vocals – Anna Rossinelli
 Producer – Georg Schlunegger
 Lyrics – Georg Schlunegger, Anna Rossinelli, Georg Dillier, Manuel Meisel
 Label: Universal Music

Chart performance

Weekly charts

Release history

References

2013 singles
Anna Rossinelli songs
Universal Music Group singles
2013 songs